Griggs Corners is an unincorporated community in Ashtabula County, in the U.S. state of Ohio.

History
A post office was established at Griggs Corners in 1867, and remained in operation until 1903. The community derives its name from Solomon Griggs, a local resident.

References

Unincorporated communities in Ashtabula County, Ohio
1867 establishments in Ohio
Unincorporated communities in Ohio